Mirzaitovo (Mirzahit) is a rural locality (a village) in Urmanayevsky Selsoviet, Bakalinsky District, Bashkortostan, Russia. The population was 87 as of 2010. There are  3 streets.

Geography 
Mirzaitovo is located 32 km southwest of Bakaly (the district's administrative centre) by road. Narat-Yelga is the nearest rural locality.

References 

Rural localities in Bakalinsky District